The Shapsug dialect is a dialect of Adyghe. The Shapsug dialect is spoken by the Shapsugs, which are one of the largest Circassian population in the diaspora outside Republic of Adygea, alongside Abzakhs.  The Shapsug dialect is very similar to the Natukhai dialect and together, they make the Black Sea coast dialects of Adyghe. The Shapsug dialect consists of three main sub dialects: Great Shapsug (North Shapsug), Small Shapsug (South Shapsug) and Hakuchi. The Shapsug dialect is best known as the dialect with palatalized velar stops.

Subdialects 

The Black Sea coast dialects
Natukhai dialect
Shapsug dialect
North Shapsugs, Great Shapsugs, Kuban Shapsugs dialect (Шапсыгъэ шху).
Kfar Kama dialect (Кфар Камэм ишапсыгъэбзэ): Shapsug dialect spoken by the villagers of Kfar Kama in Israel.
South Shapsugs, Small Shapsugs, Coastal Shapsugs Black Sea Shapsugs (Шапсыгъэ-цӏыкӏу) dialect.
Hakuchi dialect (ХьакӀуцубзэ, Къарацхаибзэ)

Phonology

Palatalized velar stops

In the Shapsug and Natukhai dialects there is a palatalized voiced velar stop  , a palatalized voiceless velar stop   and a palatalized velar ejective   that were merged with дж , ч  and кӏ  in most Adyghe dialects.  Note that the Shapsug dialect also has ч , дж  and кӏ  in words like чэмы "cow", джэмышх "spoon" and кӏалэ "boy".
 
 Shapsug гь  became дж  in other dialects:

 Shapsug кь  became ч  in other dialects:

 Shapsug кӏь  became кӏ  in other dialects:

Retroflex affricates

The retroflex affricate consonants чъ  and чӏ  (that exist in Chemguy and Bzhedug dialects) merged with the palato-alveolar affricate consonants ч  and кӏ  in the Shapsug and Natukhai dialects.

 Chemguy чъ  became ч  in Shapsug :

 Chemguy чӏ  became кӏ  in Shapsug :

Dropped consonants 

In the Great Shapsug dialect (Like Bzhedug dialect) in some cases the consonants н , м  and р  are dropped and are not pronounced.

 The consonant м  is dropped before bilabial stops б , п , пӏ  :

 The consonant н  is dropped before postalveolar affricates дж , ч , кӏ  and before alveolar stops д , т , тӏ  :

 The consonant р  is dropped before a voiceless alveolar stop т  :

Aspirated consonants
In the Shapsug dialect (Like the Bzhedug dialect) there exist a series of aspirated consonants (/pʰ/ /tʰ/ /ʃʰ/ /t͡sʰ/ /t͡ʃʰ/ /t͡ʂʰ/ /t͡ɕʰʷ/ /kʲʰ/ /kʰʷ/ /qʰ/ /qʰʷ/) that became plain consonants in other dialects:

 Shapsug пʰ  ↔ п  in other dialects :

 Shapsug тʰ  ↔ т  in other dialects :

 Shapsug цʰ  ↔ ц  in other dialects :

 Shapsug шʰ  ↔ щ  in other Adyghe dialects :

 Shapsug кь  ↔ ч  in other dialects (чʰ  in Bzhedug) :

 Shapsug кʰу  ↔ ку  in other dialects :

 Shapsug къʰ  ↔ къ  in other Adyghe dialects :

 Shapsug къуʰ  ↔ къу  in other Adyghe dialects :

 Shapsug чъʰу  ↔ чу  (spelled цу) in Temirgoy:

Others 

 Shapsug сӏ  ↔ цӏ  in other dialects:

The labialized retroflex consonants шъу  and жъу  in the Temirgoy dialect are alveolo-palatal щу  and жьу  in the Black Sea coast dialects of Adyghe (Shapsug dialect and Natukhai dialect).

 Shapsug щу  ↔ шъу  in Standard:

 Shapsug жьу  ↔ жъу  in Standard:

The Shapsug and Natukhai dialects has many different variants. The following differences apply to some of them.

 Shapsug с  ↔ ц  in Standard:

 Shapsug шъухъу [ʃʷχʷ] ↔ шхъу [ʃχʷ] in Standard:

 Shapsug р  ↔ н  in Standard:

 Shapsug ф  ↔ м  in Standard:

 Shapsug ц  ↔ с  in Standard:

Grammar differences

Instrumental case
In the instrumental case the noun has the suffix -мгьэ (-mɡʲa) or -гьэ (-gʲa) unlike other dialects that has the suffix -мкӏэ (-mt͡ʃa) or -кӏэ (-t͡ʃa).

 Shapsug: Кӏалэр Адыгэбзэгьэ мэгущаӏэ ↔ Standard: Кӏалэр Адыгэбзэкӏэ мэгущаӏэ - "The boy speaks (using) Adyghe language".
 Shapsug: Къэлэмымгьэ сэтхэ ↔ Standard: Къэлэмымкӏэ сэтхэ - "I write (using) with the pencil".

Desirement mood
In the Shapsug dialect, the suffix ~рагъу /raːʁʷ/ is added to verbs to indicate the desirement to do that verb. For example:

 Туканым сыкӏорагъу - "I want to go to the shop".
 Есыпӏэм рэкӏорэгъуагъ - "(S)he wanted to go to the pool".
 Къэкӏорэгъот кӏалэр - "The boy would want to come".
 Тутын уешъорагъуа? - "Do you want to smoke cigarette?".
 Нэущы уздэгущаӏэрагъу - "I want to speak with you tomorrow".
 Сышхэрагъу игь - "I want to eat now".

Upward prefix
In Standard Adyghe, to express that the verb's direction is upward, the prefix дэ- /da-/ and the suffix -е /-ja/ is added to the verb. In Shapsug dialect, the prefix чӏэ- /t͡ʃʼa-/ is added instead.

Demonstratives
Shapsug has six demonstratives: а /ʔaː/, гьэ /ɡʲa/, у /wə/, дыу /dəwə/, дымы /dəmə/ and мы /mə/.

а /ʔaː/
 that
  — that table
  — that girl
  — that boy is saying
 The determiner  /ʔaː/ refer to a referent that is far away and invisible to both the speaker and the listener(s). It is similar to the English language determiner that, but with the condition that the referent has to be invisible or far away.

у /wə/ (мо /mo/ in other dialects)
 that
  — that table
  — that girl
  — that boy is saying
 The determiner  refer to a referent that is visible and in a known distance from both the speaker and the listener(s) (both the speaker and the listener(s) can see the referent). It is similar to the English language determiner that, but with the condition that the referent has to be visible.

мы /mə/
 this
  — this table
  — this girl
  — this boy is saying
  — this year
 The determiner  refer to a referent that is close to both the speaker and the listener(s). It is exactly like the English language determiner this.

дыу /dəwə/ (дымо /dəmo/ in other dialects)
 that (over there)
  — that table over there
  — that girl over there
  — that boy over there is saying
  — Do you see that person over there?
 The determiner  refer to a referent that is visible. This determiner is used when the speaker wants to emphasizes that the object is in his sight, so that the listener(s) will expect the referent to be the thing (s)he looks at. It is usually used to introduce a new referent, for example it can be used to refer to a stranger on the street or to refer to a certain object on the field that is visible. This determiner might be used while pointing one's finger at the people or objects in question.

дымы /dəmə/
 this (over here)
  — this table over here
  — this girl over here
  — this boy over here is saying
  — Do you see this person over here?
 The determiner  refer to a referent that is visible. This determiner is similar to the determiner дымо. This is used instead of дымо when the referent is very near. Like the determiner дымо, it might be used while pointing one's finger at the referent in question. Even without pointing fingers the listener(s) will expect the referent to be the thing the speaker looks at. It can be used to point on objects in a room for example.

гьэ /gʲa/ (гьэ джэ /d͡ʒa/ in other dialects)
 that
  — that table
  — that girl
  — that boy is saying
 The determiner  refer to a referent which is usually invisible. This determiner is used when the referent in the conversation is clear to both the speaker and the listener(s). Someone would use this determiner in order to emphasizes that both he and the listener(s) have the same referent in mind.

У vs. Мо

Sample

Future tense
In the Great Shapsug sub dialect (like Bzhedug) the future tense suffix is ~эт (~at) and in some cases ~ыт (~ət) unlike the Small Shapsug sub dialect that has (like Chemirguy) the Suffix ~щт (~ɕt)).

Interrogative words
The word "what" in Standard Adyghe is сыд while in Shapsug it is шъыд and from it derives different terms.

Shapsug has two words for "what":
 шъыд (Refers to an inanimate object, typically tangible).
 лӏэу (Refers to an inanimate object, typically intangible).

The word "лӏэу" was lost in other Adyghe dialects. In Shapsug, from it derives different terms :

Shapsugs also have different interrogative words from the word тэ "which":

Location

Big suffix (~фо)
The standard Adyghe's suffix -шхо /-ʃxʷa/ which means big or mighty is -фo /-fˠa/ in the Shapsug dialect :

Positional prefix directly (джэхэ~)
The standard Adyghe's positional prefix -жэхэ /-ʒaxa/ which designates action directed at something or someone forcefully is -джэхэ /-d͡ʒaxa/ in the Shapsug dialect :

Positional prefix merging (го~)
 In the Shapsug and Natukhai dialects, the verbal prefix го~ /ɡʷa-/ designates process of joining or merging with an object on a body. This positional conjugation does not exist in other Circassian dialects. for example :

{|
|-
| цум || бжъитӏу || гот
|-
| цу-м || бжъ-итӏу || го-т
|-
| ||  || 
|-
| ox (erg.) || two horns || it have on his body
|-
|colspan=3|"the ox have two horns."
|}

{|
|-
|шыор || шым || гос
|-
|шыо-р || шы-м || го-с
|-
| ||  || 
|-
| the horseman (abs.) || horse (erg.) || (s)he is sitting on a body
|-
|colspan=3|"the horseman is sitting on the horse."
|}

{|
|-
|лӏыжъым || зылъакъо || готэп
|-
|лӏыжъы-м || зы-лъакъо || го-тэ-п
|-
| ||  ||
|-
| the old man (erg.) || one leg || (s)he doesn't have on his body
|-
|colspan=3|"the old man doesn't have one leg."
|}

{|
|-
|шым|| зеохьыжьым || кӏалэу ||госэр ||гозэгъ
|-
|шы-м|| зеохьы-жь-ым || кӏалэ-у ||го-сэ-р ||го-зэ-гъ
|-
| ||  ||  ||  ||
|-
| house (erg.) || to get out of control || boy (adv.) || the one on the body || (s)he fell off the body
|-
|colspan=5|"when the horse got out of control the boy sitting on it fell."
|}

Vocabulary

Sample text

See also
 Hakuchi Adyghe dialect
 Kfar Kama Adyghe dialect
 Bzhedug Adyghe dialect
 Abzakh Adyghe dialect
 Baslaney dialect

External links 
 Shapsug dialect unique words

References 

Shapsugs
Adyghe language
Circassians in Israel
Lower Galilee